The Good Old Soak is a 1937 drama film starring Wallace Beery and directed by J. Walter Ruben from a screenplay by A. E. Thomas based upon the 1922 stage play of the same name by Don Marquis.  The picture's supporting cast features Una Merkel, Eric Linden, Betty Furness, and Ted Healy.

Screenwriter Thomas was disturbed that MGM changed the title from the original "The Old Soak," to the "Good Old Soak."  MGM did that because it felt Wallace Beery's fans considered the word "good" synonymous with Beery.  Rollin Kirby, a distinguished political cartoonist on the New York World newspaper, and good friend of Don Marquis, got a laugh from Marquis when he suggested how appropriate it was that a man named Beery would portray the Old Soak himself.

The story was previously made as a silent film by Universal in 1926 called The Old Soak starring Jean Hersholt.

Cast
 Wallace Beery as Clem Hawley
 Una Merkel as Nellie
 Eric Linden as Clemmie Hawley
 Judith Barrett as Ina Heath
 Betty Furness as Lucy Hawley
 Ted Healy as Al Simmons
 Janet Beecher as Matilda Hawley
 George Sidney as Kennedy
 Robert McWade as Webster Parsons
 James Bush as Tom Ogden 
 Margaret Hamilton as  Minnie

References

External links

1937 films
1930s English-language films
1937 drama films
Films directed by J. Walter Ruben
American black-and-white films
Metro-Goldwyn-Mayer films
American drama films
Adaptations of works by Don Marquis
Films based on adaptations
American films based on plays
Films scored by Edward Ward (composer)
1930s American films